Pierre Samuel "Pete" du Pont IV (January 22, 1935 – May 8, 2021) was an American attorney, businessman, and politician from Rockland, in New Castle County, Delaware, near Wilmington. He was the United States representative for Delaware from 1971 to 1977 and the 68th governor of Delaware from 1977 to 1985. He was a member of the Republican Party.

Early life and family

Pierre Samuel du Pont IV was born on January 22, 1935, in Wilmington, Delaware. A member of the Du Pont family, he was the son of Pierre S. du Pont III and Jane Holcomb du Pont, grandson of Lammot du Pont II, and great nephew of Pierre S. du Pont, the developer of Longwood Gardens. After education at Phillips Exeter Academy, Princeton University, and Harvard Law School, he served in the U.S. Naval Reserve (Seabees) from 1957 until 1960. He was married to Elise Ravenel Wood and has four children, Elise, Pierre V, Ben, and Eleuthère.

Professional and political career
From 1963 until 1970 du Pont was employed by E.I. du Pont de Nemours and Co. In 1968, he was elected unopposed to the 12th district seat in the Delaware House of Representatives, which he held until 1971. He seriously considered a bid for a United States Senate seat in 1972 (eventually won by Democrat Joe Biden), and initially faced a likely primary election against former U.S. Representative Harry G. Haskell Jr. He then bowed out in accordance with the wish of Republican leaders, including President Richard Nixon, to have a reluctant incumbent U.S. Senator J. Caleb Boggs seek a third term.

U.S. House of Representatives

In 1970 du Pont was elected to the U.S. House of Representatives, defeating Democrat John D. Daniello, a New Castle County Councilman and labor leader. He won election to the U.S. House of Representatives two more times, defeating Democrats Norma Handloff in 1972 and University of Delaware professor James R. Soles in 1974. In Congress, du Pont supported an attempt to limit presidential authority through the War Powers Act of 1973, but was one of the last to remain loyal to U.S. President Richard M. Nixon during the impeachment process.

Governor of Delaware
Du Pont did not seek another term in the U.S. House of Representatives and instead ran for Governor of Delaware in 1976, defeating incumbent Democratic Governor Sherman W. Tribbitt. He was elected to a second term as governor in 1980, defeating Democratic State House leader William J. Gordy, and served two terms from January 18, 1977, until January 15, 1985. 
 

As Governor, du Pont signed into law two income tax reduction measures and a constitutional amendment that restrained future tax increases and limited government spending. The Wilmington News Journal praised these policies, saying that du Pont "revived [the] business climate and set the stage for [Delaware's] prosperity". In 1979, he founded the nonprofit "Jobs for Delaware Graduates", an employment counseling and job placement program for high school seniors not bound for college. This program was the model for other programs currently functioning in many states and foreign countries.

In 1981, Du Pont helped establish the credit card industry in Delaware, in a race against South Dakota, which the year before had abolished its usury law limiting the interest rates that banks can charge consumers for credit. At the time, du Pont's cousin Nathan Hayward III advocated that tiny Delaware aspire to become the "financial Luxembourg of America" – a tax haven for corporations, yacht owners, and credit card companies permitted to charge unlimited interest.  Former Du Pont Chairman Irving S. Shapiro, then a lobbyist for Citicorp, helped Gov. du Pont pass the Financial Center Development Act in 1981 with the cooperation of the leadership of both parties and others in state and local government. Intended to attract two New York state banks that would hire at least 1,000 employees, the law eventually drew more than thirty banks to Delaware, creating 43,000 new finance-related jobs and leading the state away from its previous dependence on the chemical industry in general and the Du Pont Company in particular.

Presidential aspirations
With his second and final term as governor expiring in 1985, du Pont, as the dominant Delaware politician, was widely expected by many to challenge the popular incumbent Democratic U.S. Senator and future President, Joe Biden, but du Pont had little interest in legislative politics and declined to run, preparing instead for a long shot bid for the Republican U.S. presidential nomination in the 1988 election. (His wife, Elise, ran for the U.S. Congressional seat that he had previously held in 1984, but lost to incumbent Democrat Tom Carper.) He declared his intent on September 16, 1986, before anyone else. Biden also sought his party's nomination but dropped out of the race after a plagiarism scandal.

Running in the 1988 Republican presidential primaries, du Pont presented an unconventional program. As described by Celia Cohen in her book, Only in Delaware, du Pont "wanted to reform Social Security by offering recipients private savings options in exchange for a corresponding reduction in government benefits. He proposed phasing out government subsidies for farmers. He said he would wean welfare clients off their benefits and get them into the workforce, even if government had to provide entry-level jobs to get them started. He suggested students be subjected to mandatory, random drug tests with those who flunked losing their drivers  licenses." After finishing next to last in the New Hampshire primary, du Pont exited the race.

Later career
In 1984, du Pont served as chairman of the Education Commission of the States, a national organization of educators dedicated to improving all facets of American education. He also served as chairman of the Hudson Institute from 1985 until 1987 and the National Review Institute from 1994 until 1997.

Du Pont was the chairman of the board for the National Center for Policy Analysis, a think tank based in Dallas, Texas; he was a retired director with the Wilmington, Delaware law firm of Richards, Layton, and Finger, and until May 2014, he wrote the monthly Outside the Box column for the Wall Street Journal.

Death
Du Pont died at his home in Wilmington on May 8, 2021, following a long illness.

Electoral history

References

Sources

Further reading

External links
 
 

|-

|-

|-

1935 births
2021 deaths
20th-century American politicians
American Episcopalians
American people of French descent
Candidates in the 1988 United States presidential election
Center for Strategic and Budgetary Assessments
Pierre S. du Pont IV
Republican Party governors of Delaware
Harvard Law School alumni
Hudson Institute
Republican Party members of the Delaware House of Representatives
Members of the Philadelphia Club
Military personnel from Delaware
People from New Castle County, Delaware
People from North Haven, Maine
People from Wilmington, Delaware
Phillips Exeter Academy alumni
Princeton University alumni
Republican Party members of the United States House of Representatives from Delaware
United States Navy reservists
Seabees